The discography of English boy band Blue consists of five studio albums, five compilation albums, one remix album, twenty six singles and thirteen music videos. The band originally formed in 2000 and released three studio albums, All Rise (2001), One Love (2002) and Guilty (2003) that all peaked at number one in the United Kingdom alongside releasing sixteen singles, over a four-year period. The group also worked alongside artists such as Stevie Wonder, Elton John and Lil Kim. The band also once toured with Cee Lo Green.

In late 2004, Blue announced that they would be going on a two-year hiatus. This coincided with the release of their first compilation album, Best of Blue, released on 15 November 2004. However, in 2005 they confirmed that they would be splitting due to wanting to pursue solo careers.

On 28 April 2009, Blue announced that they had reformed. In May 2011, they represented the United Kingdom at Eurovision with the song "I Can", finishing 11th. They then released their fourth studio album, Roulette on 25 January 2013, followed two years later by fifth studio album Colours.

In 2022, Blue returned with singles "Haven't Found You Yet" and a cover of "Dance with Me", both from their sixth studio album Heart & Soul which was released on 28 October 2022.

Albums

Studio albums

Compilation albums

Live albums

Video albums

Extended plays

Singles

As lead artist

As featured artist

Promotional singles

Other appearances

Music videos

References

Blue (English band)
Discographies of British artists
Pop music group discographies